Katherine Raquel Pereira (born 22 May 1999) is a Nicaraguan footballer who plays as a forward for the Nicaragua women's national team.

International career
Pereira capped for Nicaragua at senior level during the 2018 Central American and Caribbean Games, the 2018 CONCACAF Women's Championship qualification and the 2020 CONCACAF Women's Olympic Qualifying Championship qualification.

References 

1999 births
Living people
Nicaraguan women's footballers
Women's association football forwards
Nicaragua women's international footballers